Clarkville is a ghost town in northern Yuma County, Colorado, United States. It is located at an intersection where State Highway 59 curves from East-West to North-South.

History
The town was first populated in 1933, and several of its structures were moved to the town over the years, including at least two homes and the schoolhouse, the latter of which arrived from nearby Haxtun in 1940. The town derived its name from businessman Ted Clark and his family in the area, and the community was named after a post office opened there 1938. The town was depopulated after its sale in 1947.

The town was photographed by Robert Adams in 1972, and some of the work is displayed by the Yale University Art Gallery.

See also

 List of ghost towns in Colorado

References

External links

Ghost towns in Colorado
Yuma County, Colorado
1938 establishments in Colorado